Venita Wolf (September 1, 1945 – November 22, 2014) was an American  actress who appeared on television during the late 1960s. She guest-starred on Star Trek episode "The Squire of Gothos" (1967) as Yeoman Teresa Ross. Her other appearances include The Flying Nun,  The Monkees, Gunsmoke (as “Sister Margaret” - a nun - in “Ladies From St. Louis” 1967), and The Beverly Hillbillies. She appeared unbilled in The Oscar (1966), but her only feature-film credit was a supporting role in the beach movie Catalina Caper (1967).

A model and winner of numerous local beauty contests, Wolf was queen of the 1962 May Festival in Orange, California. Later that year, she was named Miss Orange County Press Club. In 1967, she appeared on the cover of the July issue of Playboy.

Personal life and death
Wolf retired from acting after her marriage in 1968 to Skip Taylor, the manager of the blues-rock band Canned Heat. They had two children before divorcing in 1972.

Wolf died on November 22, 2014, at age 69 at her home in the Hollywood Hills after a long battle with multiple myeloma and kidney failure.

References

External links
 
 

1945 births
2014 deaths
Deaths from multiple myeloma
20th-century American actresses
21st-century American women